Elliot T. Anderson (born November 15, 1982, in Marshfield, Wisconsin) is an American politician who formerly represented District 15 as a Democratic member in the Nevada Assembly from 2011 to 2019.

Education
Anderson earned his BA from UNLV and his JD from the William S. Boyd School of Law at UNLV.

Mr. Anderson is a licensed attorney in Nevada.

Elections
 2012 Anderson won the June 12, 2012 Democratic Primary with 1,632 votes (84.34%) against former Assemblyman Lou Toumin and won the November 6, 2012 General election with 11,809 votes (72.05%) against Republican nominee Megan Heryet.
 2010 When Democratic Assemblywoman Kathy McClain ran for Nevada Senate and left the House District 15 seat open, Anderson won the four-way June 8, 2010 Democratic Primary with 1,108 votes (45.80%) in a field which included former Assemblyman Lou Toomin, and won the November 2, 2010 General election with 6,760 votes (62.63%) against Republican nominee Dale Snyder and Independent American candidate Stan Vaughan; Snyder had run for the seat in 2008, and Vaughan had run for Nevada Legislature seats in 2004, 2006, and 2008.

References

External links
 Official page at the Nevada Legislature
 Campaign site
 
 Biography at Ballotpedia
 Financial information (state office) at the National Institute for Money in State Politics

1982 births
Living people
Democratic Party members of the Nevada Assembly
People from the Las Vegas Valley
People from Marshfield, Wisconsin
United States Marines
University of Nevada, Las Vegas alumni
William S. Boyd School of Law alumni
21st-century American politicians